"Old Siam, Sir" is a hard rock single from Wings' 1979 album, Back to the Egg.  It was the A-side of the UK version of the single, reaching No. 35. The B-side, "Spin It On" in the UK was also a track from the album, "Back to the Egg". "Old Siam, Sir" was also the B-side of the US single "Arrow Through Me".

Recording
Wings drummer Steve Holley, while playing keyboards during a studio session, developed a chord sequence that was eventually used in the instrumental section of the song. Paul McCartney and guitarist Denny Laine later recorded an instrumental demo for the song called "Super Big Heatwave".

Personnel
Paul McCartney – vocals, bass, electric guitar
Linda McCartney – keyboards
Denny Laine – electric guitar
Laurence Juber – electric guitar
Steve Holley – drums

Charts

References

Paul McCartney songs
1979 singles
Paul McCartney and Wings songs
Songs written by Paul McCartney
Parlophone singles
Song recordings produced by Paul McCartney
Song recordings produced by Chris Thomas (record producer)
Music published by MPL Music Publishing